"Sick, Sick, Sick" is a song by Queens of the Stone Age.

Sick, Sick, Sick may also refer to:

 Sick, Sick, Sick (film), a 2019 Brazilian film
 Sick, Sick, Sick, a 1958 book of cartoons by Jules Feiffer
 "Sick, Sick, Sick", an episode of Pete and Gladys
 "Sick, Sick, Sick", an episode of Queer as Folk

Music
 Sick, Sick, Sick, a 1987 album by Demented Are Go
 "Sick Sick Sick", a song by 16volt from Beating Dead Horses
 "Sick, Sick, Sick", a song by Bayside from Killing Time
 "Sick Sick Sick", a song by Boris the Sprinkler
 "Sick, Sick, Sick", a song by Jimmy Sweeney

See also
 Sick (disambiguation)